The 2000 MAAC Men's Ice Hockey Tournament was the 2nd championship in the history of the conference. It was played between March 10 and March 18, 2000. Quarterfinal games were played at home team campus sites, while the final four games were played at the UConn Ice Arena in Storrs, Connecticut, the home venue of the Connecticut Huskies.

Format
The tournament featured three rounds of play with each round being single-elimination. The teams that finish below eighth in the standings are ineligible for tournament play. In the first round, the first and eighth seeds, the second and seventh seeds, the third seed and sixth seeds, and the fourth seed and fifth seeds played with the winner advancing to the semifinals. In the semifinals, the highest and lowest seeds and second highest and second lowest seeds play with the winner advancing to the championship game.  The tournament champion does not receive an automatic bid to the 2000 NCAA Division I Men's Ice Hockey Tournament.

Conference standings
Note: GP = Games played; W = Wins; L = Losses; T = Ties; PTS = Points; GF = Goals For; GA = Goals Against

Bracket

Teams are reseeded after the quarterfinals

Note: * denotes overtime period(s)

Quarterfinals

(1) Quinnipiac vs. (8) Bentley

(2) Mercyhurst vs. (7) Holy Cross

(3) Canisius vs. (6) Iona

(4) Connecticut vs. (5) Sacred Heart

Semifinals

(1) Quinnipiac vs. (6) Iona

(2) Mercyhurst vs. (4) Connecticut

Championship

(4) Connecticut vs. (6) Iona

Tournament awards

MVP
Marc Senerchia (Connecticut)

References

MAAC Men's Ice Hockey Tournament
MAAC Men's Ice Hockey Tournament